My Elegy is a concert video recording of the Toshiko Akiyoshi Jazz Orchestra featuring Lew Tabackin. It was released in Japan in 1984 by LaserDisc Corp. as a LaserVision video disk.

Track listing
All songs composed and orchestrated by Toshiko Akiyoshi:  
 "Elegy" 
 "Remembering Bud" 
 "Autumn Sea" 
 "Fading Beauty" 
 "Long Yellow Road" 
 "Happy Hoofer" 
 "Kogun" 
 "Chasing After Love" 
 "Ten Gallon Shuffle" 
 "Jamming at KANI HOKEN Hall"

Personnel
Toshiko Akiyoshi – piano  
Lew Tabackin – tenor saxophone, flute   
Walt Weiskopf  – tenor saxophone   
Frank Wess – alto saxophone   
Jim Snidero – alto saxophone   
Ed Xiques – baritone saxophone     
Joe Mosello – trumpet
John Eckert – trumpet
Brian Lynch – trumpet
Chris Pasin – trumpet
Matt Finders – trombone
Hart Smith – trombone
Conrad Herwig – trombone
Chris Seiter – trombone  
Mike Formanek – bass   
Jeff Hirschfield – drums

References
LaserDisc Corporation SM068-0031 (NTSC)

Concert films
Toshiko Akiyoshi Jazz Orchestra video albums
1984 video albums
LaserDisc releases